

Events
January 2 - The annual Kaapse Klopse minstrel festival takes place in Cape Town.
February 24-25 - "Ultra South Africa" festival is held in Cape Town and Johannesburg, headlined by Dash Berlin, David Guetta and KSHMR.
March 13 - The 30th anniversary of the death of Nigerian organist and composer Fela Sowande is marked by an article by Godwin Sadoh.
July 5 - The grave of George Wilberforce Kakoma, composer of the Ugandan National anthem, is reported to have been vandalised and the composer's body stolen.
September 5 - Mauritanian singer and politician Malouma Mint El Meidah is placed under house arrest by the government, following an investigation into "economic crimes".

Albums
D'banj - King Don Come
Fally Ipupa - Tokooos
Johnny Clegg - King of Time
Janet Manyowa - Grateful
Ike Moriz - Gold Rush
Spoek Mathambo - Mzansi Beat Code
Maurice Louca, Maryam Saleh & Tamer Abu Ghazaleh - Lekhfa
Youssou N'Dour - Seeni Valeurs
Orchestra Baobab - Tribute to Ndiouga Dieng

Classical
Amr Okba - "Lonely, I Am Lonely"

Musical films
Lotanna, starring Liz Benson and Jide Kosoko

Deaths
January 16 - William Onyeabor, 70, Nigerian musician and businessman
August 11 - Segun Bucknor, 71, Nigerian musician (complications from multiple strokes)
September 2 - Halim El-Dabh, 96, Egyptian composer and ethnomusicologist
December 1 - , 59, Equatorial Guinean singer

See also 
 2017 in music

References 

Africa
African music
 Music